Rashed Ali (Arabic:راشد علي) (born 2 December 1989) is an Emirati footballer. He currently plays as a goalkeeper for Al-Wahda.

External links

References

Emirati footballers
1989 births
Living people
Al-Wasl F.C. players
Al Wahda FC players
Place of birth missing (living people)
UAE Pro League players
Association football goalkeepers